Robert German  (born Robert John German; June 16, 1978) is a United States singer, guitarist, and songwriter.

Biography
Robert German was born in Oklahoma City, Oklahoma 1978.
In 1996, at the age of eighteen after he quit attending Oklahoma State University, German bought is first guitar and began writing songs.

In April 2006, his song Marlboro Man was distributed nationally with the DVD release of Brokeback Mountain through Wolfe Video. The song was picked up in June by Sirius Satellite Radio's OutQ Channel 106, where the song went to number 1.

On November 14, 2006, German released his self-produced debut album, sirens of Brooklyn, containing 12 original tracks.
His song Well formed man was featured on National Public Radio's Open Mic series as well as
the Village Voice's High Bias with Uncle LD.

His songs open wide, Fishnet Sailor and Marlboro man, all held the number 1 position on Sirius Satellite Radio's OutQ Channel 109. His music has been featured on THIS WAY OUT
the international gay & lesbian radio magazine, broadcast on over 150 radio stations worldwide.

On September 30, 2007, the music video for Open Wide debuted as an official selection of the Coney Island Film Festival.

Discography

Studio albums

Robert German's debut album, Sirens of Brooklyn, was released on November 14, 2006. The album included 12 tracks and a hidden track titled "Knock on my door."

 2006 – Sirens of Brooklyn (Album)

CD Singles
 2008 – Unplug (limited edition single)

Demos / Promos
 2003 – Open Wide-Songs 1998–present (unreleased)
 2006 – Marlboro Man (Limited Edition Promo Single)
 2006 – Marlboro Man (Limited Edition Promo 12" Vinyl)

Influences

References

Wolfe Video

Indie Music

External links

 Robert German(official Website)
 Robert German Myspace page
 Pigeonhole Records

American male composers
21st-century American composers
American folk guitarists
American male guitarists
American male singer-songwriters
American folk singers
Musicians from Oklahoma City
1978 births
Living people
Singer-songwriters from Oklahoma
Guitarists from Oklahoma
21st-century American singers
21st-century American guitarists
21st-century American male singers